By Whose Hand? is a 1932 American mystery film directed by Benjamin Stoloff and starring Ben Lyon, Barbara Weeks and Kenneth Thomson.

In London the film premiered on a double bill with Michael Powell's quota quickie His Lordship.

A print is preserved in the Library of Congress collection.

Cast
 Ben Lyon as Jimmy  
 Barbara Weeks as Alice  
 Kenneth Thomson as Chambers  
 Ethel Kenyon as Eileen  
 William V. Mong as Graham  
 Dolores Ray as Bride 
 Nat Pendleton as The Killer  
 Tom Dugan as Drunk 
 Dwight Frye as Chick

References

Bibliography
 Chibnall, Steve. Quota Quickies: The Birth of the British 'B' Film. British Film Institute, 2007.

External links
 
 
 

1932 films
1932 mystery films
American black-and-white films
American mystery films
Columbia Pictures films
1930s English-language films
Films directed by Benjamin Stoloff
Films set in California
Films set on trains
1930s American films